One Guitar No Vocals is an instrumental album by American guitarist Leo Kottke, released in 1999.

History
"Morning is the Long Way Home" is a re-recorded version of the instrumental break that first appeared on Ice Water. The shortened version first appeared on 1971-1976. The song "Three Quarter North", which first appeared on the album A Shout Toward Noon, is here played slightly faster without any accompaniment. Originally recorded for the 1985 Tri-Star motion picture Little Treasure comes the piece "From 'Little Treasure'". A different version of "Accordion Bells" appears on Carols of Christmas II (1997) on BMG/Windham Hill where it was first recorded. The song "Bigger Situation" is a re-working and combining of "Big Situation", "I Yell at Traffic", and "Room Service (at the Tahiti Motel)". The song "Chamber of Commerce" was originally introduced at live performances as "Goddammit" and as written in response to the accidental death of Michael Hedges.

Reception

Writing for Allmusic, music critic Stephen Erlewine wrote of the album "Kottke is at his most impressive at his most intimate, turning out alternately gentle and intense solo guitar pieces. No matter how complex the music is — and it is, at minimum, moderately complex — Kottke pulls it off with grace, making it all seem easy... while this album isn't as exciting or revelatory as his earliest records, it's still a joy to hear a master at the top of his form." In her review for The Weekly Wire, critic Mari Wadsworth wrote: "Fans of the guitarist's acoustic songwriting have nothing to fear on One Guitar, No Vocals, which shows off Kottke's playing at its best to date."

Track listing
All songs were written by Leo Kottke.
 "Snorkel" – 3:24
 "Morning is the Long Way Home" – 4:25
 "Too Fast" – 5:10
 "Three Quarter North" – 3:19
 "Retrograde" – 3:07
 "Chamber of Commerce" – 3:38
 "From 'Little Treasure'" – 1:27
 "Bigger Situation" – 9:26
 "Accordion Bells" – 5:59
 "Peckerwood" – 2:21
 "Blimp" – 3:26
 "Even His Feet Look Sad" – 4:00

Personnel
Leo Kottke - 6 & 12-string guitar

Production notes
Engineered by Sam Hudson
Mastered by Doug Sax

References

External links
 Acoustic Guitar Magazine interview with Leo Kottke
 Leo Kottke official site
 Unofficial Leo Kottke web site (fan site)

1999 albums
Leo Kottke albums
Private Music albums